St. Margaret's Episcopal School (SMES) is a selective private, pre-K – 12th grade college preparatory school located in San Juan Capistrano, California. It is a member of the National Association of Episcopal Schools (NAES), the National Association for the Education of Young Children, the National Association of Independent Schools (NAIS), the Western States Association of Schools and Colleges (WASC) and the California Association of Independent Schools (CAIS).

History
St. Margaret's was founded in 1979 by the Reverend Canon Ernest Sillers. The school began with only 79 students in kindergarten through grade six. It was named in honor of the 11th-century Queen Margaret of Scotland, the patron saint of education. The significance of this name is reflected in many St. Margaret's traditions, such as the use of bagpipes in formal ceremonies, along with their athletic team nickname, the Tartans.

St. Margaret's opened an Early Childhood Development Center in 1981 and its high school in 1982. By 1985, students were enrolled in grade levels preschool through 12.

In 1986, St. Margaret's brought in Markham B. Campaigne as its second headmaster. During his 17-year tenure, St. Margaret's grew to serve over 1,200 students and expanded to a  campus. It is now included in Princeton Review's top 444 private schools in the United States book.

In 2004, Marcus Hurlbut became the new Headmaster of SMES. In 2013, William Moseley became headmaster. Dr Jeneen Graham would be the next Head of School beginning July 1, 2023.

Academics

St. Margaret's offers courses in core subjects, as well as other subjects through electives. Theater, art, music and other subjects are available to be taken in addition to the main subject. There are 26 Advanced Placement courses offered in history, math, science, art, language, theatre, music and other subjects. In addition to Advanced Placement (AP) courses, St. Margeret's offers honors courses throughout their various subjects. The variety of courses gives students the opportunity to excel to the best of their ability. In 2022, the school was ranked as the #1 Christian high school in Greater Los Angeles.

Athletics
St. Margaret's sports teams are called the Tartans, and they compete as members of the Orange Coast League in the CIF Southern Section.

In 2006, the Tartan football team finished 14-0 and won the CIF-SS Northeast Division championship. and in 2008 the Girls' Varsity Tennis Team were the Academy League and CIF Champions, defeating league rival Sage Hill in the finals to finish off a 23-0 winning streak. The 2010-2011 Athletics year was one of the most successful, with 4 CIF Championships in boys' cross country, girls' volleyball, girls' tennis, and girls' soccer teams. Additionally, the boys cross country team won the CIF Division 5 State Championship in 2010, 2011, and 2018.The varsity girls' soccer program won 4 CIF championships in 2006, 2011, 2012, and 2014. The St. Margaret's football team won the Southern California small-school division championship in the 2014-2015 season.

St. Margaret's boasts highly competitive men's and women's lacrosse programs: the school's only Division 1 CIF Southern Section sports. The men's varsity lacrosse team won the Division 1 CIF Southern Section title in 2005, 2013, 2015, and 2019, while the women's varsity lacrosse team won the Division 1 CIF Southern Section title in 2008, 2018, and 2019. From 2005-2014, St. Margaret's was a Trinity League men's lacrosse affiliate, winning the league title every year from 2007-2013.

Campus
In 2007, St. Margaret's completed construction on the DeYoung Family Math and Science Center. In 2011, St. Margaret's constructed a performing arts center, which includes the Hurlbut Theater and houses the music, dance, and theatre departments. A new middle school was constructed in 2015.

St. Margaret's has 2 gyms: the Campaigne Center, used by lower schoolers, and the Pasternack Field House, used by middle and upper schoolers. The Pasternack Field House was completed in 2007. There is a middle school field and a main football field, used by members of the high school. The campus covers 22 acres.

References

External links
St. Margaret's Episcopal School Website
2007 St. Margaret's Episcopal School Educator of Distinction by the National Society of High School Scholars

Educational institutions established in 1979
High schools in Orange County, California
San Juan Capistrano, California
Private high schools in California
Private middle schools in California
Private elementary schools in California
1979 establishments in California
Episcopal schools in the United States